Vipsania Polla was an ancient Roman woman of the late Republic, she was the sister of emperor Augustus' right hand man Marcus Vipsanius Agrippa. She is best known today for the construction of the Porticus Vipsania.

History

Early life
Polla was born in the Late Roman Republic to an plebeian family, likely from Venetia or Histria. Her father was Lucius Vipsanius Major and her mother an unknown woman. She had two brothers, Marcus Vipsanius Agrippa and Lucius Vipsanius Minor. Since Cassius Dio records her name as Polla and not Vipsania it's possible that she used Polla as her praenomen. She is also the only notable woman of her gens to not have a cognomen derived from her brother's name.

Career
Although Polla was a distinguished woman, little information about her has survived. She is remembered chiefly for overseeing construction of a monument called the Porticus Vipsania, a map of the Roman Empire engraved in marble. Marcus Agrippa started the construction of this map before his death in 12 BC and Polla took over the project using the notes that he left behind. It is likely that she also organized races in memory of her brother since he was a circus enthusiast.

Later life
Sabina Tariverdieva has proposed that she was the woman married to Quintus Haterius instead of her niece. Polla likely died some time around 7 BC.

Cultural depictions
There have been attempts made to identify some women on the Ara Pacis as Polla. Alfred von Domaszewski believed that she was the woman who touches the head of the boy next to Agrippa. Ronald Syme strongly disagreed with this idea.

See also
 Women in ancient Rome
 List of Roman women

References

Sources
https://www.livius.org/vi-vr/vipsanius/agrippa.html

Vipsanii
1st-century BC Roman women
1st-century BC Romans
7 BC deaths